Gauri may refer to:

Religion
 Gauri, an epithet of the Hindu goddess Parvati
 Mahagauri, a manifestation of Hindu goddess Durga
 Lajja Gauri, a goddess associated with abundance and fertility, also euphemistically described as Lajja

Films

 Gauri (1943 film), an Indian Bollywood film
 Gauri (1968 film), an Indian film
 Gauri Ganesha, a 1991 Kannada comedy-drama film directed by Phani Ramachandra
 Gauri (2006 film), a Marathi film
 Gauri: The Unborn, a 2007 Bollywood film
Gourang Kavugoli The most wanted Criminal

Places

India
 Gauri, Siwan, a village in Siwan district, Bihar
 Gauri Bazar, a town and a nagar panchayat in Deoria district, Uttar Pradesh
 Gauri Kund, a Hindu pilgrimage site and base camp for trek to Kedarnath Temple, in Uttaranchal
 Gauri Parbat (Ghori Parbat), a mountain peak, in Uttarakhand
 Gauri Pundah (Gauri Punda), a village in Fatuha development block of district Patna, Bihar
 Jangal Gauri, a village in Gorakhpur, Uttar Pradesh

Nepal
 Gauri, Bheri, a village in Dailekh District, Bheri Zone
 Gauri, Lumbini, a village in Kapilvastu District, Lumbini Zone

Other places
 Găuri River, a tributary of the Lotru River in Romania
 Gauri Sankar, a mountain in the Himalayas

Other uses
 Gauri (given name), a Hindu given name (including a list of persons with the name)
 Gauri (raga), raga in Indian classical music
Gauri (epic), a Nepali epic poem by Madhav Prasad Ghimire

See also
 Gawri language
 Gavri, a drama tradition from Rajasthan, India